Cobalt WASD is an action video game developed by Oxeye Game Studio and published by Mojang Studios released on 30 November 2017 for Microsoft Windows.

Gameplay 
The player plays as either a "Metalface" or a "Protobot". The Metalfaces try to defend the bomb-sites, while the Protobots try to attack and plant a bomb. When the Protobots plant the bomb, the Metalfaces must try to defuse the bomb before it explodes. The Protobots win when they kill all of the Metalfaces, and the Metalfaces win then they defuse the bomb. At the end of each round, players can choose to buy armor, weapons, or vehicles. While the game mainly focuses on the online multiplayer game mode, there is a mode where the player can play against offline bots.

Development
Cobalt WASD is a separate stand-alone spin-off of Cobalt. The developers saw that the original game was too complex for some players and its higher price point discouraged some players, so they wanted to make a completely different game. They decided to make a spin-off of Cobalt, focusing on just one game mode.

Reception 
Europgamer found Cobalt WASD to be a "very funny and competitive multiplayer game". PC Games N called it a "2D version of Call of Duty's Search and Destroy game mode".

References 

2017 video games
Action video games
Indie video games
Linux games
MacOS games
Mojang Studios
Multiplayer video games
Video games developed in Sweden
Windows games